The 2010 Belgian Super Cup was a football match that was played on 23 July 2010, between league winners Anderlecht and cup winners Gent. In a match with several chances for both teams, only Anderlecht managed to score once through Kouyaté. This meant the ninth Super Cup title for Anderlecht and left Gent still looking for their first win.

Match details

See also
Belgian Supercup

Belgian Super Cup 2010
Belgian Super Cup 2010
Belgian Super Cup, 2010
Belgian Supercup
July 2010 sports events in Europe